Clinofibrate (INN) (trade name Lipoclin) is a fibrate and a derivative of Bisphenol Z.

References

2-Methyl-2-phenoxypropanoic acid derivatives
Dicarboxylic acids
2,2-Bis(4-hydroxyphenyl)propanes